The Subramaniya Swamy Temple, Marudhamalai (also Maruthamalai or Marudamalai), or the Marudhamalai Murugan Temple, is a popular 12th-century hill temple situated in Coimbatore, Tamil Nadu, India. Built by Tamil kings during the Sangam period as indicated in the Purananuru, the temple is dedicated to Lord Murugan and is considered the Seventh House of Lord Murugan.

Like most Murugan temples, the temple is situated upon a hill, part of the Western Ghats about 12 km west from the centre of the city of Coimbatore. Thai Poosam and other Murugan festivals are celebrated here. On many evenings, the devotees take out a procession of Lord Murugan sitting in a chariot (Rath Yatra) and encircle the temple.

The temple is maintained and administered by the Hindu Religious and Charitable Endowments Department of the Government of Tamil Nadu.

Etymology
This Murugan temple is special since it is on the east face on the hill, unlike other Murugan temples on the hills.

Marudhamalai Adivaram
Marudhamalai, or Marudhamalai Adivaram (meaning "at the foot of Maradhumalai"), is also the name of the locality to the east of the hill and the temple. It forms part of the 17th ward of Coimbatore Corporation.

Site
The presiding deity is addressed by multiple names, such as Marudhamalai Andavar, Marudachalapathi and Dhandayuthanpani. There are springs or pools of sacred water (theertham) around the temple, namely Maruda Theertham and Skanda Theertham, which are believed to possess medicinal properties.

Pambatti Siddhar
In the southern end of the temple the  staircase to the Pambatti Siddhar cave is located. Pambatti Siddhar (or Paambatti Siddhar) was one of the 18 siddhars and lived during the 12th century.  Pambatti Siddhar performed penance on the Marudhamalai hill.  Lord Murugan is said to have appeared as a snake to him, and to have appeared again later along with his consorts Valli and Deivanai, who is said to have given Siddhar the Marudha Theertham and blessed him. A connecting tunnel route from Lord Murugan's sanctum sanctorum and Siddhar's cave was formed and Siddhar is believed to have used it to worship the Lord.

References

Hindu temples in Coimbatore district
Murugan temples in Tamil Nadu
Buildings and structures in Coimbatore